Automobile polo or auto polo was a motorsport invented in the United States with rules and equipment similar to equestrian polo but using automobiles instead of horses. The sport was popular at fairs, exhibitions and sports venues across the United States and several areas in Europe from 1911 until the late 1920s; it was, however, dangerous and carried the risk of injury and death to the participants and spectators, and expensive damage to vehicles.

Origins
The official inventor of auto polo is purported to be Ralph "Pappy" Hankinson, a Ford automobile dealer from Topeka who devised the sport as a publicity stunt in 1911 to sell Model T cars. The reported "first" game of auto polo occurred in an alfalfa field in Wichita on July 20, 1912, using four cars and eight players (dubbed the "Red Devils" and the "Gray Ghosts") and was witnessed by 5,000 people. While Hankinson is credited with the first widely publicized match and early promotion of the sport, the concept of auto polo is older and was proposed as early as 1902 by Joshua Crane of the Dedham Polo Club in Boston, with the Patterson Daily Press noting at the time of Crane's exhibition that the sport was "not likely to become very popular." Auto polo was also first played in New York City inside a regimental armory building in 1908 or 1909. The popularity of the sport increased after its debut in July 1912, with multiple auto polo leagues founded across the country under the guidance of the Auto Polo Association. The first large-scale exhibition of auto polo in the eastern United States was held on November 22, 1912, at League Stadium in Washington, D.C. Another exhibition was staged the following day at Hilltop Park in New York.[Brooklyn Daily Eagle, November 24, 1912, p. 14]  By the 1920s, New York City and Chicago were the principal cities for auto polo in the United States with auto polo matches occurring every night of the week. In New York, matches were held at Madison Square Garden and Coney Island.

Internationally, auto polo was regarded with skepticism and caution. In 1912, the British motoring publication The Auto described the new sport as "very impressive" and a "lunatic game" that the writers hoped would not become popular in Britain. Hankinson himself promoted auto polo in Manila in the 1910s with events sponsored by Texaco and recruited teams in the United Kingdom. Auto polo was further spread to Europe by auto polo teams from Wichita that toured Europe in the summer of 1913 to promote the sport. In Toronto in 1913, auto polo became the first motorsport to be showcased at the Canadian National Exhibition, but the sport did not become popular in Canada.

Rules and equipment

Unlike equestrian polo which requires large, open fields that can accommodate up to eight horses at a time, auto polo could be played in smaller, covered arenas during wintertime, a factor that greatly increased its popularity in the northern United States. The game was played in two halves (chukkars) and each team had two cars and four men in play on the field at a given time. The first auto polo cars used by the Dedham Polo Club were unmodified, light steam-powered Mobile Runabouts that seated only one person and cost $650 (equivalent to $ today). As the sport progressed, auto polo cars resembled stripped down Model Ts and usually did not have tops, doors or windshields, with later incarnations sometimes outfitted with primitive rollbars to protect the occupants. The mallets were shaped like croquet mallets but had a three-pound head to prevent "backfire" when striking the ball at high speeds.

Safety and damage concerns
Due to the nature of the sport, cars would often collide with each other and become entangled, with malletmen frequently thrown from the cars. Installation of rollcages over the radiator and rear platforms of the cars helped prevent injuries to players, but falls did result in severe cuts and sometimes broken bones if players were run over by the cars, though deaths due to auto polo were rare. Most of the cars would usually be severely wrecked or demolished by the time the match was finished, leaving most players uninsurable for costly material and bodily damages incurred during the game. A tally of the damages encountered by Hankinson's British and American auto polo teams in 1924 revealed 1564 broken wheels, 538 burst tires, 66 broken axles, 10 cracked engines and six cars completely destroyed during the course of the year. The sport waned in popularity during the late 1920s, mostly due to the high cost of replacing vehicles, but did have a brief resurgence in the Midwestern United States after World War II.

Gallery

See also
 Segway polo

References

Polo in the United States
Extinct sports